Classics Collection was a Capitol Nashville compilation series, one issue of which contains a selection of Glen Campbell's hits from the sixties and seventies.

Track listing
 "Galveston" (Jimmy Webb) - 2:40
 "Gentle On My Mind" (John Hartford) - 2:58
 "Wichita Lineman" (Jimmy Webb)  - 3:06
 "Dreams of the Everyday Housewife" (Chris Gantry) - 2:35
 "Hey Little One" (Dorsey Burnette, Barry De Vorzon) - 2:32
 "By The Time I Get To Phoenix" (Jimmy Webb) - 2:43
 "Rhinestone Cowboy" (Larry Weiss) - 3:15
 "Southern Nights" (Allen Toussaint) - 2:59
 "Bonaparte's Retreat" (King, Stewart) - 2:49
 "Country Boy (You Got Your Feet In L. A.) (Dennis Lambert, Brian Potter) - 3:09

Production
Producers - Al De Lory, Dennis Lambert & Brian Potter, Gary Klein, Jimmy Bowen
Art direction - Virginia Team
Design - Jerry Joyner
Photography - Beverly Parker
Compiled by Chip Hardy
Mastered by Glenn Meadows at Masterfonics

1990 compilation albums
Glen Campbell compilation albums